The Party with a First and Last Name was a Croatian political party founded by Dalija Orešković.

History 

In October 2018 Dalija Orešković announced she would enter politics on the centre spectrum. On December 29, 2018 she announced her party will be called START, standing for "Party of Anti-corruption, Development and Transparency". She ran for president in 2019, obtaining 55,163 or 2.9% of the votes, coming in 6th out of 11 candidates, and being eliminated in the first round.

In May 2020, the START changed its name to Party with a First and Last Name (SIP), and Orešković stepped down from the position of party president. Ivan Kovačić was elected as the new leader of the party. In the parliamentary elections held on 5 July 2020, she was elected for member of Croatian Parliament. In November 2020, the party merged with the Pametno to form a single party, called the Centre

Election results

Legislative

References 

Political parties established in 2019
Political parties disestablished in 2020
Political parties in Croatia